During the 1997–98 season, Leeds United competed in the Premier League (known as the FA Carling Premiership for sponsorship reasons).

Season summary
After a goal-shy Leeds side managed only an 11th-place finish the previous season, the acquisition of Dutch striker Jimmy Floyd Hasselbaink bolstered their attack substantially and they were soon back to their winning ways after two seasons of struggle. George Graham's hard work in his second season as manager soon paid off with a fifth-place finish – the club's highest for three years – and UEFA Cup qualification.

Final league table

Results summary

Results by round

Results
Leeds United's score comes first

Legend

FA Premier League

FA Cup

League Cup

Players

First-team squad
Squad at end of season

Left club during season

Reserve squad

Transfers and loans

Transfers in

Transfers out

Total spending:  £5,800,000

Loaned in

Loaned out

Notes

References

Leeds United
Leeds United F.C. seasons
Foot